The Barnegat Branch Trail is a rail trail in Ocean County, New Jersey.

The trail occupies a  abandoned rail corridor in Ocean County, New Jersey, that
extends from Barnegat Township
to Toms River. The trail was built on the former Barnegat Branch Division roadbed of the Central Railroad of New Jersey (CNJ). The bankrupt CNJ was absorbed into Conrail in 1976, who terminated freight service the following year.

Controversy 
A  segment of the trail right-of-way has been the focus of an ongoing battle to build a bypass road
for Route 9. Lacey Township officials are proposing a shared road-walkway for this section of the trail. After legal battle, it was ruled that the town could use the trail for a roadway.

References

External links
 Barnegat Branch Trail Website
 archive Official Trail planning web site
 Ocean County Dept. of Planning
 Ocean County Parks 
 Affiliate web site

Rail trails in New Jersey
Protected areas of Ocean County, New Jersey
Bike paths in New Jersey